Aaron Walker (born June 4, 1990) is an American soccer player who plays as a midfielder for Greenville Triumph SC in USL League One.

Youth and college
Aaron Walker was born on June 4, 1990 in Woodstock, Georgia. He played youth soccer in the North Atlanta Soccer Association in Marietta, Georgia, and attended Etowah High School.

In 2008, he matriculated to Oglethorpe University in nearby Brookhaven, Georgia. He started for the men's soccer team, the Stormy Petrels in NCAA Division III, for all four of his years at the school. In 2011, his senior year, the Stormy Petrels advanced to their first-ever Southern Collegiate Athletic Conference championship, and Walker was named to the All-SCAC First Team. Walker graduated from Oglethorpe in 2012.

Career
After college, Walker played for Georgia Revolution in the National Premier Soccer League in 2012 and 2013.

From 2013 to 2016, he played for BI/Bolungarvik in 1. deild karla, the second-tier professional league in Iceland.

On January 6, 2017, United Soccer League side FC Cincinnati announced that they had signed Walker for their 2017 season. In a quote on the club's website, head coach John Harkes said, "We were impressed by Aaron during the Open Tryout last month and we feel are pleased that we have a player coming from our tryout for the second straight year. We think he will be a good fit." However, John Harkes was fired by the club on February 17, 2017, and Walker ultimately saw no playing time in competitive matches during the 2017 season. On October 25, the club announced they had not exercised their option to keep Walker for the 2018 season.

In 2018, Walker returned to his native Georgia to play for amateur club Atlanta Silverbacks FC in the National Premier Soccer League. He served as captain for the 2018 season and notched six goals and four assists.

In February 2019, Walker, as well as his former FC Cincinnati teammate Dallas Jaye, signed with Greenville Triumph SC in the third-tier professional league USL League One. The two were reunited with their former coach John Harkes, who was serving as the head coach and sporting director for Greenville Triumph. Walker re-signed with Greenville on January 11, 2022.

References

External links
 
 
 Profile at FC Cincinnati Website

1990 births
Living people
People from Woodstock, Georgia
Sportspeople from the Atlanta metropolitan area
Soccer players from Georgia (U.S. state)
American soccer players
Association football midfielders
Georgia Revolution FC players
Vestri (football club) players
FC Cincinnati (2016–18) players
Atlanta Silverbacks players
Greenville Triumph SC players
National Premier Soccer League players
1. deild players
USL League One players
American expatriate soccer players
American expatriate sportspeople in Iceland
Expatriate footballers in Iceland